Anadelosemia condigna is a species of snout moth in the genus Anadelosemia. It was described by Carl Heinrich in 1956. It is found in the south-western United States.

References

Moths described in 1956
Phycitinae
Moths of North America